The Roman Catholic Diocese of Agboville is a diocese located in the city of Agboville in the Ecclesiastical province of Abidjan in Côte d'Ivoire.

History
 October 14, 2006: Established as Diocese of Agboville from the Diocese of Yopougon

Special churches
The Cathedral is the Cathédrale Sainte-Jean-Marie-Vianney in Agboville.

Leadership
 Bishops of Agboville (Roman rite)
 Bishop Alexis Touably Youlo (since 2006.10.14)

See also
Roman Catholicism in Côte d'Ivoire
 List of Roman Catholic dioceses in Côte d'Ivoire

Sources
 GCatholic.org
 Catholic Hierarchy

Roman Catholic dioceses in Ivory Coast
Christian organizations established in 2006
Roman Catholic dioceses and prelatures established in the 21st century
Lagunes District
Agnéby-Tiassa
2006 establishments in Ivory Coast
Roman Catholic Ecclesiastical Province of Abidjan